Redhill School may refer to:

 Redhill School (Johannesburg), in Morningside, Johannesburg, Gauteng, South Africa
 Redhill School, Stourbridge, in Stourbridge, West Midlands, England
 Redhill Academy, in Arnold, Nottinghamshire, England
 Red Hill School, in Red Hill, Canberra, Australia
 A primary school in Red Hill, New Zealand

See also 
 Redhill (disambiguation)